Rune Medalen (born 13 April 1970) is a retired Norwegian football striker.

A first cousin of Linda Medalen, he went from third-tier Ålgård FK in 1992 to being Bryne FK's top goalscorer in 1993 and securing a contract with Viking FK in 1994. In 1996 he was shipped on to Sogndal Fotball, returning to Rogaland and Bryne FK in 1997. In 2003, his contract was due to expire at the end of the year, and at the onset of the season Medalen faced long-term injury, meaning that he never returned to professional football.

References

1970 births
Living people
Norwegian footballers
Ålgård FK players
Bryne FK players
Viking FK players
Sogndal Fotball players
Norwegian First Division players
Eliteserien players
Association football forwards